Arthur Tripp was a college football player. He was a prominent guard for the Tennessee Volunteers football team of the University of Tennessee from 1926 to 1928. Tripp was selected All-Southern in 1928.

References

Tennessee Volunteers football players
American football guards
All-Southern college football players